Chinchpur is a village located in the Taluka of Motala, in Buldhana district, Maharashtra, India, with a total population of 1292.

According to Census 2011 information the location code or village code of Chinchpur village is 528732. It is situated 5 km away from sub-district headquarter Motala and 25 km away from Buldana. As per 2009 stats, Sanglad is the gram panchayat of Chinchpur village.

The total area of the village is 614.41 hectares. There are about 281 houses in Chinchpur .

References

  

Villages in Buldhana district